Juncus acutus, the spiny rush, sharp rush or sharp-pointed rush, is a flowering plant in the monocot family Juncaceae. It is native to the Americas, Northern and Southern Africa, Western and Southern Europe and West Asia, and is found in a variety of wet habitats, such as bogs, fens, meadows, and salt marshes, and along the edges of ponds and lakes.

The sharp-pointed rush is a perennial plant that grows to a height of about 60 to 100 centimeters (24 to 39 inches). It has slender, cylindrical stems with narrow, pointed leaves and clusters of small, light brown flowers that bloom in the summer.

This species is important for a variety of reasons. It provides habitat and food for a range of wetland animals, including insects, birds, and mammals. It is also an important component of wetland ecosystems, helping to prevent soil erosion and maintain water quality. In some countries like Australia it is considered to be an invasive weed and the spines harmful to young children.

In addition, sharp-pointed rush has been used for a variety of purposes, including as a source of fiber for making paper, baskets, and other woven products, and for medicinal purposes. The plant has also been used for landscaping and erosion control, as well as for ornamental purposes in gardens and wildflower meadows.

Despite its ecological and cultural significance, Juncus acutus is considered to be of least concern in terms of conservation, as it is widely distributed and not currently threatened by habitat loss or other factors. However, continued conservation efforts are necessary to protect this species and its habitat and ensure its long-term survival.

Synonyms
Juncus acutus ssp. leopoldii  (Parl.) Snog. -- Leopold's rush
Juncus acutus L. var. sphaerocarpus Engelm
Juncus acutus L. subsp. acutus
Juncus spinosus Forssk
Juncus acutus ssp. leopoldii also known as Leopold's rush is a native of Arizona, California, Georgia and Nevada.
Juncus acutus L. var. conglobatus Trautv
Juncus acutus L. var. decompositus Guss
Juncus acutus L. var. longibracteatus Buchenau

Description
Juncus acutus is a brown and green 
tussock-forming 
perennial that can grow to 
tall in all kinds of soils,  
in areas which go from extremes in flood and dry like dunes
or that just stay wet like lowland grassland and grassy woodland, riparian vegetation, freshwater wetland, and saline and subsaline wetlands.
Stems and leaves Pith filled stems and leaves arise from the base at different angles giving the plant a globe shape.  The leaves form a basal sheath around the flower stem leaves and end with a stiff sharp point.
They emerge from the base at all angles and each have 1 - 6 flowers. The flowers are hermaphrodite and are pollinated by the wind. 
Roots Short and robust rhizomes.

Gallery

Distribution
Found principally in low-lying damp, low fertility areas like sandy sea shores and dune slacks and coastal flats, occasionally in salt marshes and disturbed saline areas, mine dumps, lowland grassland and grassy woodland, riparian vegetation, freshwater wetland, and saline and subsaline wetlands
Palearctic: 
Northern Africa: Algeria, Egypt, Morocco
Western Asia: Iran, Iraq, Israel, Jordan, Lebanon, Turkey
Caucasus: Armenia, Azerbaijan, Georgia
Northern Europe: British Isles
Southeastern Europe: Albania, Crete, Greece, Italy, Kosovo, Montenegro, Sardinia, Serbia, Sicily, Malta
Southwestern Europe: Azores, Balearic Islands, Corsica, France, Portugal, Spain
Nearctic: 
Northern America: Baja California

Community species 
In Brazil, J. acutus has been observed on the Santa Catarina coast living in communities with:
Ipomoea pes-caprae
Hydrocotyle bonariensis
Senecio crassiflorus
In a natural shallow depression in the Murray River floodplain in South Australia:
Muehlenbeckia florulenta
Atriplex semibaccata
Halosarcia pergranulata ssp. pergranulata 
Mimulus repens
Ludwigia peploides ssp. montevidensis
Phragmites australis 
Paspalum vaginatum

Chemistry 
The dimeric phenanthrenoid 8,8'-bidehydrojuncusol and the monomeric juncusol and dehydrojuncusol can be isolated from J. acutus.

References

External links

acutus
Halophytes
Palearctic flora
Flora of South America
Flora of North America
Flora of Baja California
Flora of Brazil
Flora of Europe
Plants described in 1753
Taxa named by Carl Linnaeus